Steven Gordon Whittaker (born 16 June 1984) is a Scottish former professional footballer and coach, who is currently an assistant manager with Fleetwood Town. He played as a defender.

Whittaker began his career with Hibernian and made over 170 appearances in his first spell with the Easter Road side. He also won the Scottish League Cup in 2007 before signing for Rangers in August that year. Whittaker won three Scottish Premier League titles, two Scottish Cups and three Scottish League Cups with Rangers. At the start of the 2012–13 season, he signed for Norwich City on a free transfer. After five years with Norwich, Whittaker returned to Hibernian in 2017, before moving to Dunfermline Athletic in 2020 in what would be his final season as a footballer.

He made 31 international appearances for the Scotland national team between 2009 and 2016. On 13 May 2022 Whittaker joined Fleetwood Town As Assistant Manager

Club career

Hibernian
Despite being a boyhood Hearts fan, Whittaker joined Kenny Miller and Derek Riordan in signing for Hibernian from the Hutchison Vale Boys Club. He made his debut against St Johnstone in a 1–0 win on 12 May 2002. In the 2002–03 season, he went on to make further six first-team appearances before finally becoming a regular starter the following season. Due to Whittaker lacking a defined position, his form suffered as he was deployed at right-back and across the midfield under Bobby Williamson. He scored his first career goal against Partick Thistle in a 3–2 win on 3 January 2004. He was an unused substitute when Hibernian lost the 2004 Scottish League Cup Final.

The arrival of Tony Mowbray later that year saw Whittaker confirmed in the team's right back role, and with this new certainty, he flourished, becoming a regular in the Scotland under-21 team and helping Hibernian to a third-place league finish. Whittaker was a regular in the Hibs teams of both Mowbray and John Collins, and was in the side that won the 2007 League Cup Final. He made 174 appearances in all competitions for Hibs, scoring five goals.

Rangers
Whittaker completed a £2 million move to Rangers on 1 August 2007, signing a five-year contract. He was given the number 28 shirt and started his first game for Rangers on 18 August 2007 against Falkirk in the Scottish Premier League, marking his debut with the second goal in a 7–2 win for Rangers. Having been deployed mostly at left back during the first half of the season, Whittaker established himself as first-choice right back after Alan Hutton's departure to Tottenham Hotspur in January 2008. Whittaker scored the second goal of Rangers 2–0 win over Sporting CP in the UEFA Cup quarter-final second-leg on 10 April 2008. He picked the ball up on the halfway line and "danced through the Sporting defence" before scoring.

For the 2009–10 season, Whittaker was given number 16 and scored 11 goals in all competitions as Rangers won both the league title and the League Cup. His goal tally was aided by regularly taking penalties.

Whittaker signed a new five-year contract with Rangers in July 2011, after the club had rejected bids from Turkish club Bursaspor. During a UEFA Champions League qualifier against Swedish club Malmö FF, he was sent off for throwing the ball at an opponent player after receiving a poor tackle.

Rangers entered administration in February 2012 and were subsequently liquidated. Charles Green, who bought the business and assets of Rangers from the administrator, attempted to transfer the player contracts to a new Rangers company. Whittaker was one of several players to object to this proposal. PFA Scotland had previously commented that players were entitled to become free agents if they objected to the transfer. Whittaker explained himself in a news conference, saying, "I'm 28 and I want to play at the top level for as much as I can. It doesn't look like Rangers will be in the SPL and there's no European football. We owe no loyalty to the new club. There is no history there for us."

Norwich City
Whittaker signed for English Premier League club Norwich City on 30 June 2012, signing a four-year deal. On 20 July, Whittaker received provisional international clearance from FIFA that allowed him to play while arbitration over his move from Rangers continued.

Whittaker suffered an ankle injury during a friendly match against Celtic, which caused him to miss the start of the 2012–13 Premier League season. Two months after receiving his ankle injury, he described it as the worst of his career. He made his competitive debut for Norwich on 31 October, playing at right back in a 2–1 win against Tottenham Hotspur. A few days later, Whittaker made his league debut for the club, playing at right back and stayed on the pitch for 90 minutes, in a 1–0 win over Stoke City. After making his debut, Whittaker said he was pleased to make his debut with a win. The following month, on 8 December 2012, Whittaker scored his first goal in his Premier League career after an assist from Robert Snodgrass in a 4–3 win over Swansea City.

Whittaker scored in the opening game of the 2013–14 Premier League season with a goal against Everton. His blasted shot struck the post and bounced back out, but he beat Tim Howard to the rebound to tap it back in. He also assisted debuting teammate Ricky van Wolfswinkel; Whittaker sliced a shot with his foot which floated toward Van Wolfswinkel, who was free to head-in the goal. Norwich were relegated in 2013–14, but Whittaker played regularly in 2014–15 as they were promoted by winning the play-off final. Whittaker set up one of the goals in the final.

Whittaker received his first red card in a league game against Southampton in August 2015; he was booked for blocking Matt Targett from taking a throw-in, and three minutes later, received a second yellow (and consequently a red) for grappling Dušan Tadić's shirt during a challenge. Following Whittaker's sending-off, Norwich were defeated 3–0. Norwich were again relegated in 2015–16, while Whittaker played less frequently for their first team. In May 2017, Norwich announced that Whittaker would be released at the end of his contract.

Hibernian (second spell)
On 15 July 2017, Whittaker rejoined Hibernian on a three-year deal. He scored a goal in his second league debut for Hibs, a 3–1 win against Partick Thistle on 5 August.

A hip injury prevented Whittaker from playing during the latter part of the 2018–19 season.

After Paul Heckingbottom was sacked as head coach in November 2019, Whittaker assisted caretaker manager Eddie May. After four months out of the team, Whittaker was used as a defensive midfielder in both matches of a Scottish Cup tie with Dundee United in January 2020. Whittaker was one of three first team players released by Hibs at the end of the 2019–20 season.

Dunfermline Athletic
Following his release from Hibernian, Whittaker signed a one-year deal with Scottish Championship club Dunfermline Athetlic, which would also see him take up a position as a coach with the side. In June 2021 it was announced that Whittaker had retired from playing in order to take up a full-time coaching position with Dunfermline. After Peter Grant's tenure as Dunfermline manager ended, Whittaker, along with Greg Shields, were appointed joint interim manager of the club. Shields and Whittaker were in charge for two matches, before John Hughes was appointed on a permanent basis.

International career

Whittaker was a regular for the Scotland under-21 squad. In October 2006 he was added to the full Scotland squad for the Euro 2008 qualifying match against Ukraine, although he did not feature in the match. Whittaker was then called into the Scotland B side to face a Republic of Ireland B team on 20 November 2007. He played 68 minutes before being replaced by Ross McCormack. He also played in the goalless draw between those two sides in November 2006.

He made his debut for the full national side on 12 August 2009, in a 4–0 defeat to Norway. His second appearance came in the 2–0 victory over Macedonia, when he came on for the injured Callum Davidson. Whittaker earned 31 caps up to March 2016. He dropped out of the squad as he lost his place at Norwich, but was recalled in September 2017.

Career statistics

Club

International appearances

Managerial statistics

Honours
Hibernian
Scottish League Cup: 2006–07

Rangers
Scottish Premier League: 2008–09, 2009–10, 2010–11
Scottish Cup: 2007–08, 2008–09
Scottish League Cup: 2007–08, 2009–10, 2010–11
UEFA Cup runner-up: 2007–08

Norwich City
Football League Championship play-offs: 2015

References

External links

1984 births
Living people
Footballers from Edinburgh
Association football fullbacks
Association football utility players
Scottish footballers
Scotland international footballers
Scotland B international footballers
Scotland under-21 international footballers
Hibernian F.C. players
Rangers F.C. players
Dunfermline Athletic F.C. players
Scottish Premier League players
People educated at Lasswade High School Centre
Norwich City F.C. players
Premier League players
English Football League players
Lothian Thistle Hutchison Vale F.C. players
Scottish Professional Football League players
Dunfermline Athletic F.C. non-playing staff
Dunfermline Athletic F.C. managers